The Aubane Historical Society (AHS) is a historical society of amateur historians based in Millstreet, County Cork in Ireland, focusing on local history and the Irish revolutionary period. Brendan Clifford and Jack Lane, members of both the AHS and British and Irish Communist Organisation (BICO), grew up in the Aubane area of north Cork. The AHS has published numerous pamphlets on local history matters, often in relation to the Home Rule politician William O'Brien, the novelist Canon Patrick Sheehan, and the local poet Ned Buckley. According to Jack Lane, the AHS was originally intended to be a local history organisation, but later expanded into the role of opposing the "revisionist" movement in Irish history. The Society has been highly critical of Peter Hart, whom it accuses of falsifying interview material, with denunciations of Roy Foster, Brian Hanley, Paul Bew, and Henry Patterson. The AHS regularly attacks Hubert Butler (whom it accuses of being a quasi-racist defender of Protestant Ascendancy) and Elizabeth Bowen, whom it claims acted as a British spy in Ireland during the Second World War and hence lacking any Irish identity.  AHS has worked with some writers who might be seen as representing a more traditional republican perspective, including Desmond Fennell, Brian P. Murphy osb, Eoin Neeson and Meda Ryan.

AHS has also denied that the killing of two young Cooneyite Protestant farmers at Coolacrease, Co. Offaly in 1921 was sectarian (it claims they were properly executed for attacking the forces of the legitimate, democratically elected (Dáil) government). It has been associated with commentators and the Roger Casement Foundation who argue that the diaries ascribed to Roger Casement were forged by British Intelligence while arguing that Casement's published opposition to England and participation in the First World War was a correct position for Irish people to take.

It often presents itself in populist terms as a group of amateurs speaking for the plain people of Ireland as against academic historians, whom it presents as elitist snobs with sinister political agendas.

The AHS's interpretation of Irish history has been criticised by some Irish academics.

References

Citations

External links
 

Anti-Revisionism (Ireland)
History of County Cork
Irish historians
Marxist historians
Historical societies based in the Republic of Ireland
Millstreet